Huntersfield Stadium is a multi-use stadium in Katlehong, South Africa.  It is currently used mostly for football matches and was the home stadium of Jomo Cosmos.

References

Soccer venues in South Africa
Sports venues in Gauteng
Sport in Germiston
Ekurhuleni